Yevlakh City Stadium is a multi-purpose stadium in Yevlakh, Azerbaijan. It is currently used mostly for football matches. It serves as a home ground of FK Karvan.  The stadium holds 5,000 people.

See also
List of football stadiums in Azerbaijan

Football venues in Azerbaijan
Multi-purpose stadiums in Azerbaijan